Elizabethtown Independent Schools (EIS) is a school district headquartered in Elizabethtown, Kentucky.

Through the 2019–20 school year, its high school, Elizabethtown High School, served high school students in West Point, and therefore was a feeder high school of the West Point Independent School District, which only covered grades K-8. The West Point district closed at the end of that school year and merged into Hardin County Schools (HCS), which serves the rest of Hardin County apart from Fort Knox (which has its own federally administered schools). West Point students who had attended Elizabethtown High before the HCS merger will not be able to complete their education there; the last such students are not expected to graduate in 2023.

Schools
 Traditional
 Elizabethtown High School
 TK Stone Middle School
 Helmwood Heights Elementary School
 Morningside Elementary School
 Other
 Panther Academy
 Valley View Education Center
 Glen Dale Center

See also
 Hardin County Schools

References

External links
 Elizabethtown Independent Schools
 

School districts in Kentucky
Education in Hardin County, Kentucky